The 14th Academy Awards honored film achievements in 1941 and were held at the Biltmore Hotel in Los Angeles, California. The ceremony is now considered notable as the year in which Citizen Kane failed to win Best Picture, losing to John Ford's How Green Was My Valley. Later regarded as the greatest film ever made, Citizen Kane was nominated for nine awards but won only one, for Best Original Screenplay.

John Ford won his third Best Director award for How Green Was My Valley, becoming the second to do so (after Frank Capra), and the first to win the award in consecutive years (following The Grapes of Wrath in 1940).

Much public attention was focused on the Best Actress race between sibling rivals Joan Fontaine, for Alfred Hitchcock’s Suspicion, and Olivia de Havilland, for Hold Back the Dawn. Fontaine won, becoming the only acting winner from a film directed by Hitchcock.

The Little Foxes set a record by receiving nine nominations without winning a single Oscar; this mark was matched by Peyton Place in 1957, and exceeded by The Turning Point and The Color Purple, both of which received 11 nominations without a win.

This year marked the debut of the Academy Award for Best Documentary Feature.

A portion of the ceremony was broadcast by CBS Radio.

Awards 

Nominations were announced on February 6, 1942. Winners are listed first, highlighted in boldface, and marked with a dagger symbol.

Academy Honorary Award
 Rey Scott for Kukan
 The British Ministry of Information for Target for Tonight
 Leopold Stokowski for Fantasia
 Walt Disney, William Garity, John N. A. Hawkins, and the RCA Manufacturing Company for Fantasia

Irving G. Thalberg Memorial Award
Walt Disney

Multiple nominations and awards

The following 26 films received multiple nominations:
 11 nominations: Sergeant York
 10 nominations: How Green Was My Valley
 9 nominations: Citizen Kane and The Little Foxes
 7 nominations: Here Comes Mr. Jordan
 6 nominations: Hold Back the Dawn
 4 nominations: Ball of Fire, Blossoms in the Dust, and That Hamilton Woman
 3 nominations: The Chocolate Soldier, Dr. Jekyll and Mr. Hyde, The Maltese Falcon, Sun Valley Serenade, Sundown, and Suspicion
 2 nominations: All-American Co-Ed, All That Money Can Buy, Aloma of the South Seas, Blood and Sand, Buck Privates, The Devil and Miss Jones, Dumbo, Ladies in Retirement, Louisiana Purchase, Topper Returns, and You'll Never Get Rich

The following four films received multiple awards:
 5 wins: How Green Was My Valley
 2 wins: Here Comes Mr. Jordan, Sergeant York, and Fantasia

See also
1941 in film

References

Academy Awards ceremonies
1941 film awards
1942 in American cinema
CBS Radio programs
1942 in Los Angeles
February 1942 events